The 1944 Arizona gubernatorial election took place on November 7, 1944. Incumbent Governor Sidney Preston Osborn ran for reelection, and easily won the Democratic primary, with only token opposition as former Governor Robert Taylor Jones declined to challenge Osborn to a rematch following two losses, in 1940 and 1942.

In a virtually identical race to 1940 and 1942, Sidney Preston Osborn defeated Jerrie W. Lee in the general election, and was sworn into his third term as Governor on January 2, 1945.

Democratic primary
The Democratic primary took place on July 18, 1944. Incumbent Governor Sidney Preston Osborn ran for reelection, and defeated State Senator William Coxon easily, with former Governor Robert Taylor Jones declining to challenge Osborn after losing to him twice in the past two election cycles in 1940 and 1942.

Candidates
 Sidney Preston Osborn, incumbent Governor
 William Coxon, State Senator

Results

Republican primary

Candidates
 Jerrie W. Lee, 1938, 1940, 1942 Republican gubernatorial nominee
 Harry F. Michael

Results

General election

References

1944
Arizona
Gubernatorial
November 1944 events